Lawrenceport is an unincorporated community in Bono Township, Lawrence County, Indiana.

History
Lawrenceport was platted in 1837. It was named in honor of Josiah Lawrence, owner of land near the town site. A post office was established at Lawrenceport in 1851, and remained in operation until it was discontinued in 1859.

Geography

References

Unincorporated communities in Lawrence County, Indiana
Unincorporated communities in Indiana
1837 establishments in Indiana